Microspermae is an order of flowering plants. It is a descriptive botanical name referring to the size of the seed; it  was used for the order containing the orchids. 

In taxonomical systems this name has now mostly dropped out of use, being displaced by the name Orchidales (formed from the family name Orchidaceae). The name Microspermae was used in the Bentham & Hooker and the Engler systems. The Wettstein system also used a descriptive name, but preferred Gynandrae.

Microspermae in the Bentham & Hooker system
 order Microspermae
 family Hydrocharideae
 family Burmanniaceae
 family Orchideae

Microspermae in the Engler system
 order Microspermae
 family Orchidaceae

Historically recognized angiosperm orders